Neutrophil elastase (leukocyte elastase, ELANE, ELA2, elastase 2, neutrophil, elaszym, serine elastase, subtype human leukocyte elastase (HLE)) is a serine proteinase in the same family as chymotrypsin and has broad substrate specificity. Neutrophil elastase is secreted by neutrophils during inflammation, and destroys bacteria and host tissue. It also localizes to neutrophil extracellular traps (NETs), via its high affinity for DNA, an unusual property for serine proteases.

As with other serine proteinases it contains a charge relay system composed of the catalytic triad of histidine, aspartate, and serine residues that are dispersed throughout the primary sequence of the polypeptide but that are brought together in the three dimensional conformation of the folded protein. The gene encoding neutrophil elastase, ELA2, consists of five exons. Neutrophil elastase is closely related to other cytotoxic immune serine proteases, such as the granzymes and cathepsin G. It is more distantly related to the digestive CELA1.

The neutrophil form of elastase is 218 amino acids long, with two asparagine-linked carbohydrate chains (see glycosylation). It is present in azurophil granules in the neutrophil cytoplasm. There appear to be two forms of neutrophil elastase, termed IIa and IIb.

Gene 

In humans, neutrophil elastase is encoded by the ELANE gene, which resides on chromosome 19.

Function 

Elastases form a subfamily of serine proteases that hydrolyze many proteins in addition to elastin. Humans have six elastase genes that encode the structurally similar proteins elastase 1, 2, 2A, 2B, 3A, and 3B. Neutrophil elastase hydrolyzes proteins within specialized neutrophil lysosomes, called azurophil granules, as well as proteins of the extracellular matrix following the protein's release from activated neutrophils. Neutrophil elastase may play a role in degenerative and inflammatory diseases by its proteolysis of collagen-IV and elastin of the extracellular matrix. This protein degrades the outer membrane protein A (OmpA) of E. coli as well as the virulence factors of such bacteria as Shigella, Salmonella and Yersinia. Mutations in this gene are associated with cyclic neutropenia (CyN) and severe congenital neutropenia (SCN). At least 95 disease-causing mutations in this gene have been discovered. This gene is clustered with other serine protease gene family members, azurocidin 1 and proteinase 3 genes, at chromosome 19pter. All 3 genes are expressed coordinately and their protein products are packaged together into azurophil granules during neutrophil differentiation.

Clinical significance 

Neutrophil elastase is an important protease enzyme that when expressed aberrantly can cause emphysema or emphysematous changes.  This involves breakdown of the lung structure and increased airspaces. Mutations of the ELANE gene cause cyclic and severe congenital neutropenia, which is a failure of neutrophils to mature. In 2019 study was confirmed that ELANE deletion does not cause neutropenia.

Inhibitors 

In order to minimize damage to tissues, there are few inhibitors of neutrophil elastase. One group of inhibitors are the Serpins (Serine Protease Inhibitors). Neutrophil elastase has been shown to interact with Alpha 2-antiplasmin, which belongs to the Serpin family of proteins.

See also 
 Elastase

References

Further reading

External links 
  GeneReviews/NCBI/NIH/UW entry on ELANE-Related Neutropenias
 
 

EC 3.4.21
Extracellular matrix remodeling enzymes